Persatuan Sepakbola Tanah Laut or Persetala is an Indonesian football team based in Pelaihari, Tanah Laut Regency, South Kalimantan. They currently competes in Liga 3.

Honours
 Liga 3 South Kalimantan
 Champions: 2019, 2022

References

Football clubs in Indonesia
Football clubs in South Kalimantan
Sport in South Kalimantan
Association football clubs established in 1981
1981 establishments in Indonesia